Envane is the fifth EP by British electronic music duo Autechre, released by Warp Records on 27 January 1997. The EP consists of four tracks.  Like Autechre's previous EP Anvil Vapre, Envane was originally released both in a CD version containing all four tracks, and in a vinyl version of two 12" records sold separately, which each contained two tracks apiece.

The cover art was created by Sheffield-based design agency The Designers Republic, with similar but distinct geometric images appearing on the CD copy, and the two vinyl records.  In all three cases, the cover art is an abstraction of a photograph of Fallingwater, a modern house designed by American architect Frank Lloyd Wright.

The opening track "Goz Quarter" contains both scratching and a vocal sample taken from "No Awareness" on Dr. Octagonecologyst.

Track listing

Notes

References

External links
Envane at the Warp Records discography. 

1997 EPs
Autechre EPs
Warp (record label) EPs
Albums with cover art by The Designers Republic